Tiffany Affair was an American R&B girl group, composed of Ayanna (born 1988), Bianca (born 1988), Gabrielle (born 1990), and Natasha (born 1990). It was originally a quartet but then later became a trio when Natasha image on stage and back stage during private interviews. The girls were brought to Reprise's attention by guitarist Robert Randolph. They released their first single "Start a Fire", produced by Stargate.

They started performing in commercials and musical theaters at a young age. Their name originates from both a street in New Jersey called "Tiffany Blvd" and their original recording spot in a warehouse previously owned by Tiffany & Co. Their influences are John Legend, Alicia Keys, Destiny's Child, Gwen Stefani, Boyz II Men, and Christina Aguilera. Their debut album, tentatively titled Flavors, was originally scheduled for a fall 2006 release, was pushed to a mid-2007 date, then was ultimately scrapped.

On June 4, 2007, Tiffany Affair sang the "Star Spangled Banner" at the NASCAR Nextel Cup Autism Speaks 400, held at Dover International Speedway.

Discography

Singles
"Start a Fire" (2006)
"Over It" (2007)
"Fakin' It"

References

Musical groups established in 2006
Musical groups from New York City